Josip Ćuk (19 March 1936 – 25 April 2019) was a Yugoslav sports shooter. He competed in the 300 metre rifle, three positions and 50 metre rifle, prone events at the 1960 Summer Olympics.

References

1936 births
2019 deaths
Yugoslav male sport shooters
Olympic shooters of Yugoslavia
Shooters at the 1960 Summer Olympics
People from Donja Stubica